2nd Bukreyevo or Vtoroye Bukreyevo is a rural locality in Lebyazhensky Selsoviet Rural Settlement, Kursky District, Kursk Oblast, Russia. Population:

Geography 
The village is located on the Mlodat River (a left tributary of the Seym), 89 km from the Russia–Ukraine border, 14 km south-east of Kursk, 5 km from the selsoviet center – Cheryomushki.

 Climate
2nd Bukreyevo has a warm-summer humid continental climate (Dfb in the Köppen climate classification).

Transport 
2nd Bukreyevo is located 6 km from the road of intermunicipal significance  (Kursk – Petrin), on the road  (2nd Bukreyevo – Khoruzhevka – Smorodnoye), 7 km from the nearest railway halt Zaplava (railway line Klyukva — Belgorod).

The rural locality is situated 18 km from Kursk Vostochny Airport, 106 km from Belgorod International Airport and 202 km from Voronezh Peter the Great Airport.

References

Notes

Sources

Rural localities in Kursky District, Kursk Oblast